The 1993/94 FIS Nordic Combined World Cup was the 11th World Cup season, a combination of ski jumping and cross-country skiing organized by FIS. It started on 4 Dec 1993 in Saalfelden, Austria and ended on 19 March 1994 in Thunder Bay, Canada.

Calendar

Men

Standings

Overall 

Standings after 9 events.

Nations Cup 

Standings after 9 events.

References

External links
FIS Nordic Combined World Cup 1993/94 

1993 in Nordic combined
1994 in Nordic combined
FIS Nordic Combined World Cup